Nectandra spicata is a species of flowering plant in the family Lauraceae.

It is endemic to Rio de Janeiro city, in natural areas of the Atlantic Forest ecoregion,  within Rio de Janeiro state, southeastern Brazil.

It is on the IUCN Red List, threatened by habitat loss in the city.

References

spicata
Endemic flora of Brazil
Flora of the Atlantic Forest
Flora of Rio de Janeiro (state)
Data deficient plants
Taxa named by Carl Meissner
Taxonomy articles created by Polbot